Thomas Huber (born 4 November 1963 in Stuttgart) is a German former water polo player who competed in the 1984 Summer Olympics and in the 1988 Summer Olympics.

See also
 List of Olympic medalists in water polo (men)

References

External links
 

1963 births
Living people
German male water polo players
Olympic water polo players of West Germany
Water polo players at the 1984 Summer Olympics
Water polo players at the 1988 Summer Olympics
Olympic bronze medalists for West Germany
Olympic medalists in water polo
Sportspeople from Stuttgart
Medalists at the 1984 Summer Olympics
20th-century German people
21st-century German people